Bozhou is a prefecture-level city in northwestern Anhui province, China. It borders Huaibei to the northeast, Bengbu to the southeast, Huainan to the south, Fuyang to the southwest, and Henan to the north. Its population was 4,996,844 at the 2020 census, of whom 1,537,231 lived in the built-up area made of Qiaocheng urban district, even though the county remains largely rural.

Administration

The prefecture-level city of Bozhou currently administers 4 county-level divisions, including 1 district and 3 counties.
Qiaocheng District
Guoyang County
Lixin County
Mengcheng County

Geography
Bozhou features a monsoon-influenced humid subtropical climate (Köppen Cwa) with four distinct seasons. Winters are damp and cold (yet the precipitation is low) while summers are hot and humid. Rainfall is heavily concentrated in the warmer months, as more than half of the annual total occurs from June to August. With monthly percent possible sunshine ranging from 46% in January and March to 54% in May, the city receives 2,242 hours of bright sunshine annually.

History

Bozhou was, in addition to being a prefecture during the Tang dynasty, once the Qiao Commandery at the time of the Sui dynasty.

In 1355, during the Yuan dynasty, Han Lin'er was proclaimed by Liu Futong to be the Emperor of Great Song (a reference to the extinct Song dynasty) with the regnal year Longfeng. Chao was nicknamed "The Little Ming King".

In 1368, Bo Prefecture was downgraded in status and became a county. In 1496, it was again upgraded to a prefecture/Fu then later lowered to a county in 1912 (after 1911 Revolution) when it became Bo County. In May 1986, it was upgraded to a county-level city administered by Fuyang Prefecture. In 1996, Bozhou was upgraded to a provincially directly administered city, under the control of Fuyang City on behalf of the province. The province has directly administered Bozhou since February 1998. In June 2000, Bozhou was made a prefecture-level city.

The city is located on two main Chinese train routes running from capital Beijing to the south and from the east to Shanghai which facilitate the easy transportation of goods and people.

Bozhou's population currently stands at around the three million mark which makes it small by Chinese standards. Whilst Bozhou is currently developing and expanding, it still has few internationally recognized brands based in the city.

Traditional Chinese Medicine Market
Bozhou is currently the capital of Traditional Chinese medicine (TCM) in mainland China, with one of the largest TCM industries and production area in the country. In 2008, companies based in Bozhou exported over 160,000 tons of products (out of total Chinese exports of 240,000 tons). Whilst relatively underdeveloped compared to coastal regions of China, Bozhou continues to be the primary location and trading hub for TCM within China. The international TCM Expo is held in Bozhou in September each year which sees delegates from around the world coming to discuss TCM.

Notable people
Cao Song, father of Cao Cao
Cao Cao (155 - 220), last chancellor and de facto ruler of the Eastern Han Dynasty
Hua Tuo (110 - 208 (estimated)), renowned Eastern Han Dynasty physician, first inventor of general anaesthesia
Hua Mulan, legendary heroine who disguised herself as a man in order to replace her father in the army draft
Zhang Jun, (b. 1963), economist and professor at Fudan University

References

External links
Government website of Bozhou (in Simplified Chinese)
New English version of Bozhou's tourist website

 
Cities in Anhui